Jüri Reinvere (born December 2, 1971 in Tallinn) is an Estonian composer, poet and essayist who has been living in Germany since 2005.  His compositions often consist of original poetry set to music and are based on cosmopolitan life experience. His art combines diversity of style with psychological observation.

Life 
Jüri Reinvere grew up in Tallinn. He attended the Tallinn Music High School from 1979 to 1990. His first composition teacher was Lepo Sumera. The pianistic training he received in Tallinn took him as far as the concert exam, which enabled him to subsequently work as a pianist and organist. Life in Soviet Estonia at this time was characterized by strong pressure towards Russification. Reinvere’s open interest in Russian culture, however, familiar to him from an early age, remained unaffected.

From 1990 to 1992 Reinvere studied composition at the Fryderyk-Chopin-Music-Academy in Warsaw. From 1992 to 2005 he lived in Finland. From 1994 onwards, he studied composition with Veli-Matti Puumala and Tapio Nevanlinna at the Sibelius Academy in Helsinki, earning a master's degree in 2004. In addition, he worked as an organist at the Church of the Cross in Lahti and as a radio essayist for Finnish and Estonian radio stations, wrote occasional scripts for documentary films and was also employed as a TV producer.

In 1993 he met the Estonian-Swedish pianist and writer Käbi Laretei, who Reinvere himself calls his most important mentor. For a decade and a half, he remained in close contact with her and her former husband, the Swedish film and theatre director Ingmar Bergman. Bergman introduced Reinvere to the tradition of Ibsen’s and Strindberg’s Northern-European drama and to the psychological characterization of dramatic figures. Reinvere’s first prose works were soon followed by poetry written in English. This paved the way for writing his own libretti for his operas Puhdistus (Purge) in Finnish and Peer Gynt in German. 

In 2000 he won the International Rostrum of Composers, the composition award of the UNESCO’s International Music Council; the same body honored him again in 2006. From 2000 to 2001 he held a fellowship at the Berlin Academy of Arts. In 2005 Reinvere moved to Berlin, Germany, and since 2017 he has been living in Frankfurt am Main. Reinvere is a Finnish citizen.

Works 
Reinvere’s aesthetics have two aspects: on the one hand, decided modernism with all its attendant harshness of sound, and a steadfastly courageous romanticism on the other. Thus, his music takes on many different sound guises. His large-scale works, especially the operas, take a middle path between the two aspects. They adhere to a psychological understanding of drama, but expand the means of expression beyond the tradition familiar today. Reinvere often combines advanced methods of sound production with classical narrative structures. The stringent development of the work’s form goes hand-in-hand with a thematic opening toward other art forms, questions of theology, politics, general history and everyday life. The main focus, however, remains on the immediate, sensual presence of art.

Stage works: ballets and operas 
Reinvere first worked in Germany in 2000 and 2001, mainly in cooperation with the choreographer Michaela Fünfhausen. The ballets Dialog I, Luft-Wasser-Erde-Feuer-Luft and his radio opera The Opposite Shore merge structural thinking as it was taught at the Sibelius Academy with influences of sound art, some of them employing electronically processed sounds of nature.

Ten years after the ballets, Reinvere independently reworked the bestseller novel "Puhdistus" by Sofi Oksanen into an opera with his own libretto: this is Reinvere’s first dramatic work as a poet and also a political work, and its importance was registered internationally. The world premiere took place in 2012 at the Finnish National Opera in Helsinki.

Peer Gynt was subsequently commissioned by the Norwegian National Opera in Oslo and its artistic director Per Boye Hansen. Tracing Henrik Ibsen’s drama, which became a national symbol of Norway due to Edvard Grieg's music, Reinvere questions the importance of national symbols today. At the same time, he sets the story within the horizon of a theology of grace following Søren Kierkegaard. The world premiere took place on November 29, 2014. The opera was met with large media response, partly because of its connotation of the 2011 Norway attacks committed by Anders Behring Breivik, partly because of its dealing with topics such as euthanasia and the lassitude of Western culture. Reinvere received the Estonian State Award for “Peer Gynt” in 2015.

Works based on Reinvere’s own poetry 
Since the creation of t.i.m.e for solo flute and narrators (2005), Reinvere’s non-theatrical works have often also been settings of his own poetry, mostly written originally in English. His writing most often takes the form of free verse, but also features complex meters and rhyme forms. His language employs symbols with several layers of meaning and allusions to literary history, especially in a series of poems based on English Romantic authors. Thus, Norilsk, the Daffodils (for orchestra and narrator) makes reference to William Wordsworth, The Empire of May (for chamber ensemble and voice) to John Keats and The Arrival at the Ligurian Sea (for solo flute and chamber ensemble) to Percy Bysshe Shelley.

His 2009 Requiem (for chamber choir, solo flute and narrator) deals with death and dying in today’s world. Although Reinvere does not use religious terms and forms, his Requiem remains open to an interpretation of death as found in Christian faith. The cycle Four Quartets combines his own poems with string quartets and follows T. S. Eliot’s work of the same title. Like Eliot, Reinvere sets out to turn concrete life places into symbols of human existence. In the pre-recorded tape for the first of the Four Quartets, Reinvere uses original sound documents from the maternity ward’s delivery room at the Central Hospital in Tallinn.

Further works 
In Reinvere’s other works, one often finds genre borders crossed and various techniques combined, for example the incorporation of documentary material into aesthetically through-composed music by means of Musique concrète. Thus, his Livonian Lament (2003) uses sound recordings from the Livonian Coast, commemorating the slow death of the Livonian language, long marginalized.
Harmonically, his early Double Quartet with Solo Piano of 1994 still offers clear references. Later works maintain such tonal conceptions, but they are less obvious. Often, Reinvere does entirely without the links of tonality, relying on instrumental and vocal sounds and the sound of narration, closer to noise than to precisely defined pitch. Clearly arranged textures are used according to a classical understanding of polyphony. Time, shaped dramaturgically, enables the listener to develop listening expectations while simultaneously confronting him with the unforeseen.

Essays 
Reinvere’s essays deal with the verbal and non-verbal transmission of thoughts and feelings, as well as the manipulation or even destruction of cultural memory. These topics mainly reflect his own biography and the life of Reinvere’s Estonian forebears, but he also discusses the general condition of Europe and the USA. Drawing upon his experiences in Finnish parish life and his life in cities such as Berlin, Moscow, London, Florence and Warsaw, Reinvere also investigates phenomena such as consolation, grace or beauty – which people experience without being able to produce or fabricate them. The proximity of squalor and sublimity, similar to the themes of Fyodor Dostoyevsky writings, appears in Reinvere’s essays and in his poetry.

Since November 2013, Reinvere has occasionally contributed opinion pieces on current events to the daily German newspaper Frankfurter Allgemeine Zeitung. There, he questioned in principle whether Western strategies were likely to improve the situation of sexual minorities in Russia. In another article, Reinvere described the fears of Russian intervention in the Baltic States after the annexation of Crimea in 2014 as based on the yet-unresolved experiences of 1939/40 and the period after 1990. 

Lately, his articles for the FAZ have been about strategies of the Soviet and post-Soviet factionalism in the interplay between inner political conflicts and Western attention. Since 2015 he has been part of the staff of the Finnish Music Magazine “RondoClassic”, since 2016 he has also commented cultural-analytical and political issues for the national leading daily paper “Postimees” as well as for the Estonian weekly paper “Sirp”. For his annotations in the latter, he received the annual Enn Soosaar Award, now known as the Ethical Essayists Award, in Tallinn in 2017.

Musical works (selection) 
 Peer Gynt, opera based on  play by Henrik Ibsen (2014)
 Puhdistus („Purge“), opera based on the novel of the same title by Sofi Oksanen
 Requiem (for Solo Flute and four Male Voices, with video, 2009)
 Norilsk, the Daffodils (for Symphony Orchestra and spoken word from the tape, 2012)
 Lieder bei schwindendem Licht. Five poems for soprano and orchestra (2016)
 Double Concerto for two German flutes, string orchestra and drums (2016)
 Four Quartets I-III (for string quartet and narrator from tape, 2012-2016)
 Frost at Midnight (for Bass Flute and Chorus, 2008)
 The Empire of May (for Chamber Ensemble, 2010)
 Written in the Sand (for Symphony Orchestra, 2001)
 Luft-Wasser-Erde-Feuer-Luft (for the Michaela Fünfhausen's Ballet “The Feathered Serpent”, 2003)
 Double Quartet with Piano Solo (1994)
 Northwest Bow (for Chamber Ensemble, 1998)
 The Opposite Shore (Radio-Opera, 2003)
 Livonian Lament (Tape, 2003)
 t.i.m.e. (for Solo Flute and Electronics, with video, 2005)
 Causerie des confiseurs. Miniatures for eight pianos and sixteen hands (2016)
 Under progress: Works for orchestra for the Göteborgs Symfoniker (2018)

Discography 
 2009 a second...a century
 2010 Requiem (CD+DVD)

References

External links 
 Official Website
 Sofi Oksanen about Jüri Reinvere
 Full list of works  (Eesti Muusika Infokeskus)
 Jüri Reinvere on YouTube and Soundcloud

1971 births
Living people
People from Tallinn
Musicians from Tallinn
Tallinn Music High School alumni
International Rostrum of Composers prize-winners
20th-century Estonian composers
21st-century Estonian composers
Estonian expatriates in Finland
Finnish people of Estonian descent
Naturalized citizens of Finland